Rang Laaga is a 2015 Pakistani drama serial that originally aired on ARY Digital from 11 March 2015 to 4 November 2015, airing a total 34 episodes. It was directed by Anjum Shahzad and was written by Sana Fahad. The drama stars Saima Noor, Faisal Qureshi, Neelam Muneer and Saboor Ali in pivot roles. At the annual 15th Lux Style Awards, Rang Laaga received five nominations, including Best TV Play for Mustafa and Kazmi, Best TV Actor for Qureshi, Best TV Actress for Noor, Best Director for Shehzad, and Best Writer for Fahad.

Cast
 Saima Noor as Shehnaz
 Faisal Qureshi as Aashiq Hussain
 Neelam Muneer as Rizwana
 Zhalay Sarhadi as Laila
 Saboor Ali as Shumaila
 Moomal Khalid as Samina
 Afshan Qureshi as Shabana
 Aliya Ali as Shehar Bano
 Salahuddin Tunio as Inspector Shaukat
 Raeed Muhammad Alam as Haider
 Gul-e-Rana as Laila's mother
 Beena Chaudhary as Shehar Bano's aunt
 Nida Mumtaz as Rizwana's mother
 Aamir Qureshi

Awards

The drama received five nominations at 15th Lux Style Awards.

References

External links
 

Pakistani drama television series
ARY Digital original programming
Urdu-language telenovelas
2015 Pakistani television series debuts
2014 Pakistani television series endings
2015 Pakistani television series endings
Films directed by Nadeem Baig (director)
ARY Digital